William Edward Anderson (November 28, 1895 – March 13, 1983), nicknamed "Lefty", was a Major League Baseball pitcher. In two career games, he had a 0–0 record with a 10.13 ERA. He batted right-handed and threw left-handed.

External links

1895 births
1983 deaths
Boston Braves players
Major League Baseball pitchers
Baseball players from Massachusetts